Salim Ahmed Salim (born 23 January 1942) is a Tanzanian politician and diplomat who has worked in the international diplomatic arena since the early 1960s. He served as Prime Minister for one year 1984-1985.

Early life
Salim was born in what was then considered the Sultanate of Zanzibar to Sheikh Ahmed Salim Riyami, an ethnic Arab of Omani descent while his mother was a local-born mixed-descent Tanzanian, born to an ethnic Arab father and a mixed Afro-Arab mother.

Education
He was educated at Lumumba College in Zanzibar and later pursued his undergraduate studies at the St. Stephen's College of the University of Delhi and obtained his master's degree in International Affairs from the School of International and Public Affairs at Columbia University in New York.  He became a student activist in the 1950s and was founder and first Vice President of the All-Zanzibar Student Union.

Positions held in Tanzania
 Chief Editor of a Zanzibar daily paper, Secretary General of the All-Zanzibar Journalists Organisation 1963–1964
 Minister for Foreign Affairs 1980–1984
 Prime Minister of Tanzania 1984–1985
 Deputy Prime Minister of Tanzania 1986–1989
 Minister for Defence and National Service 1986–1989
 President of the Julius K. Nyerere Foundation 2001 – current
 Member of the Central Committee of the ruling political party in Tanzania (Chama Cha Mapinduzi).
 Member of the Tanzania Commission for Constitution Review 2012–2014

Diplomatic positions held
 Deputy Chief Representative of the Zanzibar Office based in Havana, Cuba 1961–1962
 Tanzania Ambassador to the Arab Republic of Egypt 1964–1965
 Tanzanian High Commissioner (i.e. Ambassador) to India 1965–1968
 Tanzania Ambassador to the People’s Republic of China 1969–1970
 Permanent Representative of Tanzania to the United Nations 1970–1980
 Tanzania Ambassador to Cuba 1970–1980 (served while at the UN)
 Tanzanian High Commissioner to Guyana, Barbados, Jamaica, Trinidad and Tobago 1970–1980 (served while at the UN)
 Secretary-General of the OAU 1989–2001
 African Union Special Envoy on the Darfur Conflict 2004–2008

Positions at the United Nations

 June/July 1972: Chairman of the United Nations Special Mission to Niue
 August 1972: Drafting Committee of the Political Committee of the Ministerial Conference of non-Aligned States, Georgetown, Guyana
 1972 to 1980: Chairman of the United Nations Special Committee on Decolonization (Committee of 24).
 April 1973: Chairman of the Political Committee of International Conference of Experts in Support of the Victims of Colonialism and Apartheid in Southern Africa, Oslo
 1975: Chairman of the Security Council's Committee on Sanctions against Southern Rhodesia
 1976: President of the United Nations Security Council
 1979: President of the United Nations General Assembly for the Thirty-fourth, Sixth emergency special, Seventh emergency special, and Eleventh special sessions.
 1981: President of the International Conference on Sanctions against South Africa.
 1984: President of the Paris International Conference Against Apartheid.

Campaign for UN Secretary General

In 1981, Salim Ahmed Salim ran for Secretary-General of the United Nations against the two-term incumbent, Kurt Waldheim of Austria. Salim was then serving as President of the United Nations General Assembly, and he had the support of the Organisation of African Unity and the Non-Aligned Movement. He could also count on China to veto Waldheim in the Security Council. However, Salim was opposed by the Reagan administration in the United States, which regarded him as an anti-American radical who was hostile to South Africa and supported Palestinian statehood. The Soviet Union also opposed Salim for his activism and his pro-China stance.

Salim won the first round of voting with 11 votes to Waldheim's 10. As expected, Salim was vetoed by the United States, and Waldheim was vetoed by China. Salim's support dropped after the first round, as some countries believed that the United States was implacably opposed to Salim, while China had previously dropped its veto of Waldheim in 1971 and 1976. However, neither country would relent, as the selection deadlocked for 6 weeks over a total of 16 rounds of voting. The deadlock finally ended when Waldheim and Salim both withdrew from the race, opening up the selection to other candidates.

In 1996, Salim was again mentioned for the office. Secretary-General Boutros Boutros-Ghali was running unopposed for a second term and had the support of 14 of the 15 members of the Security Council. The United States was opposed to Boutros-Ghali and offered to support any other African candidate, including Salim Ahmed Salim. However, France made it clear that it would veto Salim, so he was not nominated.

Other diplomatic positions
At the continental level, following the invitation of the President of the African Development Bank, he has since March, 2002 been acting as African Water Ambassador whose responsibilities include advocacy, sensitization, and mobilization of support on African water issues.  He also serves as:

 Chairman, Advisory Board, Institute of Security Studies (ISS) based in Pretoria, South Africa
 Chairman of the International Board of Trustees, Africa Humanitarian Action (AHI) based in Addis Ababa, Ethiopia
 Member and Chairman of the Advisory Board of Trustees of the Institute of Peace, Leadership and Governance, Africa University, Mutare, Zimbabwe
 Member of the Panel of the Wise, a consultative body of the African Union

At international level, Salim serves on the following boards, panels and commissions:
 Co-chair, Eminent Persons Group (EPG) on Small Arms and Light Weapons (Secretariat, based in Washington DC)
 Member of the Board at the Mo Ibrahim Foundation, an organisation which supports good governance and great leadership in Africa. Salim is also Chair of the Foundation’s Ibrahim Prize Committee, having taken over from the inaugural chair, Kofi Annan in 2011. 
 Member of the Global Leadership Foundation, an organization which works to support democratic leadership, prevent and resolve conflict through mediation and promote good governance in the form of democratic institutions, open markets, human rights and the rule of law. It does so by making available, discreetly and in confidence, the experience of former leaders to today’s national leaders. It is a not-for-profit organization composed of former heads of government, senior governmental and international organization officials who work closely with Heads of Government on governance-related issues of concern to them.
 Member of the Board of the South Centre (Secretariat based in Geneva)
 Member, Policy Advisory Commission, World Intellectual Property Organization (WIPO)
 Member of the Foundation Council, Centre for Humanitarian Dialogue based in Geneva
 Eminent Member of the Sergio Vieira de Mello Foundation

Honours and awards

Honours

Awards
2014: Son of Africa Award by the African Union

Honorary degrees

Recipient of the 2006 Martin Luther King "Drum Major for Justice" award.

References

External links
 Presidents of the General Assembly
 The South Center – Geneva
 East African Center for Constitutional Development
 Salim's Speech on HIV/AIDS
 Salim on Darfur
 Press release on Darfur
 AU in Darfur

|-

|-

1942 births
Living people
Chama Cha Mapinduzi politicians
Prime Ministers of Tanzania
Foreign ministers of Tanzania
Delhi University alumni
School of International and Public Affairs, Columbia University alumni
Presidents of the United Nations General Assembly
Permanent Representatives of Tanzania to the United Nations
High Commissioners of Tanzania to Barbados
High Commissioners of Tanzania to Guyana
High Commissioners of Tanzania to Trinidad and Tobago
High Commissioners of Tanzania to Jamaica
High Commissioners of Tanzania to India
Ambassadors of Tanzania to Egypt
Ambassadors of Tanzania to Cuba
Ambassadors of Tanzania to China
Tanzanian Muslims
Commanders of the National Order of Mali
Recipients of the Order of the Companions of O. R. Tambo
Tanzanian people of Omani descent
Recipients of orders, decorations, and medals of Senegal
Recipients of orders, decorations, and medals of Sudan